In Andhra Pradesh, Mayor is the head of city corporations in 16 cities. All the duties in the city at Corporation level are carried in his name. He is also first citizen of the city. However in Andhra Pradesh, the Mayor is the ceremonial head as he was elected among the corporators and executive authority rests with the municipal commissioner. Following elections to any municipal corporation, there will be an election to the mayor and after that election to the post of deputy mayor is also being conducted. the governor usually invites the party (or coalition) with a majority of seats to form the state government. The governor appoints the chief minister, whose council of ministers are collectively responsible to the assembly. Given they have the municipal corporation's confidence, the mayor's term is usually for a maximum of five years; there are no limits to the number of terms they can serve.

Current Mayors

References

Local government in Andhra Pradesh